The 2023   Chile Open (also known as the Movistar Chile Open for sponsorship reasons) was a men's tennis tournament played on outdoor clay courts. It was the 25th edition of the Chile Open, and part of the ATP 250 of the 2023 ATP Tour. It took place in Santiago, Chile from 27 February through 5 March 2023.

Champions

Singles 

  Nicolás Jarry def.  Tomás Martín Etcheverry, 6–7(5–7), 7–6(7–5), 6–2

Doubles 

  Andrea Pellegrino /  Andrea Vavassori def.  Thiago Seyboth Wild /  Matías Soto, 6–4, 3–6, [12–10]

Point and prize money

Point distribution

Prize money 

*per team

Singles main draw entrants

Seeds 

 Rankings are as of February 20, 2023.

Other entrants 
The following players received wildcards into the singles main draw:
  Cristian Garín 
  Alejandro Tabilo
  Dominic Thiem

The following player received entry as a special exempt:
  Nicolás Jarry 

The following players received entry from the qualifying draw:
  Riccardo Bonadio 
  Juan Manuel Cerúndolo 
  Yannick Hanfmann 
  Camilo Ugo Carabelli

The following player received entry as a lucky loser:
  Carlos Taberner

Withdrawals 
  Federico Coria → replaced by  Juan Pablo Varillas
  Bernabé Zapata Miralles → replaced by  Carlos Taberner

Doubles main draw entrants

Seeds

 Rankings are as of February 20, 2023.

Other entrants
The following pairs received wildcards into the doubles main draw:
  Tomás Barrios Vera /  Alejandro Tabilo
  Thiago Seyboth Wild /  Matías Soto

Withdrawals
  Marco Bortolotti /  Sergio Martos Gornés → replaced by  Sergio Martos Gornés /  Carlos Taberner
  Marcelo Demoliner /  Andrea Vavassori → replaced by  Andrea Pellegrino /  Andrea Vavassori
  Thiago Monteiro /  Fernando Romboli → replaced by  Luis David Martínez /  Fernando Romboli

References

External links 
 

Chile Open
Chile Open (tennis)
Chile Open
Chile Open
Chile Open